Bahia Falls is a waterfall on the Santo Antônio River, in city of Santo Antônio do Rio Abaixo, in the state of Minas Gerais in Brazil.

The waterfall has three different forms: Cascade, chains and rapids (the main waterfalls are cascades and current, the rapids are seen below).

References 

Waterfalls of Brazil
Landforms of Minas Gerais